The Caatinga antwren (Radinopsyche sellowi) is a species of bird in the family Thamnophilidae. It is the only member of the monotypic genus Radinopsyche. Prior to 2022, it was classified in the genus Herpsilochmus, but was reclassified into Radinopsyche by the International Ornithological Congress following a 2021 phylogenetic study.

It is endemic to Brazil. Its natural habitats are subtropical or tropical dry forests and dry savanna. It is threatened by habitat loss.

References

Caatinga antwren
Birds of the Caatinga
Endemic birds of Brazil
Caatinga antwren
Taxonomy articles created by Polbot